James Maxwell (9 May 1720 – 1800) was a Scottish poet and essayist, known as the "Poet in Paisley".

Life
Maxwell was born in Auchenback, Renfrewshire, on 9 May 1720. Most of the details of his life come from his autobiographical poem of 1795. Aged 20 he went to England with a hardware pack; he was not successful, and was a weaver for twenty years, and later a tradesman's clerk and a school usher. He  returned to Scotland and for a period was a schoolmaster. Eventually Maxwell settled in Paisley, Renfrewshire in 1782. The following year he was destitute and worked breaking stones for highways; afterwards he sold pamphlets and his own publications, eventually selling only his own works. In 1787 the town council of Paisley gave him a pension; he died in the spring of 1800.

He usually designating himself "Poet in Paisley"; sometimes on the title-page he  added to his name the letters S.D.P.: "Student of Divine Poetry". James Cuthbert Hadden wrote "He rarely rises above doggerel" in his article on Maxwell in the Dictionary of National Biography.

Works
His works include moral essays, and poems about industrial progress. A bibliography, comprising fifty-two separate publications, is given in Robert Brown's Paisley Poets, volume 1, pages 17–23.

Works include:
 Divine Miscellanies; or, Sacred Poems (Birmingham, 1756)
 Hymns and Spiritual Songs (London, 1759)
 A new Version of the whole Book of Psalms in Metre (Glasgow, 1773)
 The Wonder of Wonders: or, The Cotton Manufacture. A Poem. Being a general account of the rapid progress of that branch and other, at the new Town of Johnstone.... (Paisley, 1785)
 Happiness. A Moral Essay shewing the Vain Pursuits of Mankind after Happiness.... (Paisley, 1786)
 The Great Canal; or, the Forth and Clyde Navigation. A Poem descriptive of that Useful and Extensive Undertaking.... (Paisley, 1788)
 Animadversions on some Poets and Poetasters of the Present Age (Paisley, 1788), a poem in which his contemporaries Robert Burns and John Lapraik are regarded unfavourably
 On the French Revolution. A Moral Essay on the Rights of Man (Paisley, 1792)
  A Brief Narrative, or, Some Remarks on the Life of James Maxwell, Poet, in Paisley, an autobiographical poem, written in his seventy-sixth year (Paisley, 1795)

See also
List of 18th-century British working-class writers

References

External links
 Animadversions on some Poets and Poetasters of the Present Age www.lapraik.com
 James Maxwell at hymnary.org

1720 births
1800 deaths
People from Paisley, Renfrewshire
18th-century Scottish poets
Church of Scotland hymnwriters
Scottish essayists